Edīte Medne is the Latvian ambassador to Georgia, replacing Ingrīda Levrence. She was appointed in 2022.

Biography
At the University of Latvia, Medne studied history and philosophy.

Career
Medne began her diplomatic career in 1995 and has served as the Latvian Permanent Representative to the European Union. IN 2018, she was Deputy Head of Mission for the Latvian Embassy in Dublin.

References

Ambassadors to Georgia (country)
Living people
Permanent Representatives of Latvia to the European Union
University of Latvia alumni
Women ambassadors
Year of birth missing (living people)